Édith Scob (21 October 1937 – 26 June 2019) was a French film and theatre actress, best known for her role as the daughter with a disfigured face in Eyes Without a Face (1960).

Early life and family
Scob was born Édith Helena Vladimirovna Scobeltzine, the granddaughter of a Russian Army general and White Russian émigré. Her father was an architect and her mother a journalist. Her elder brother, Michel Scob (1935–1995), was a French cycling champion and Olympian. At age 14, she underwent treatment for anorexia. Her love of literature inspired an interest in theatre. Scob was studying French at the Sorbonne and taking drama classes when she was cast in her first role.

She and her husband, composer Georges Aperghis, have two sons, Alexander (born 1970) and Jerome (born 1972), both writers.

Career
Scob gained a high profile early in her career when she appeared in Eyes Without a Face (1960). She was twice nominated for the César Award for Best Supporting Actress for Summer Hours (2008) and Holy Motors (2012).

Following the events of May 1968, Scob founded an avant-garde theatre in Bagnolet with her husband, composer Georges Aperghis, with the goal of introducing more culture to the most disadvantaged people.

Theatre

Filmography

References

External links

 

1937 births
2019 deaths
Actresses from Paris
French film actresses
French television actresses
French stage actresses
20th-century French actresses
21st-century French actresses
French people of Russian descent